Martina Laird (born 1971) is a Trinidadian actress, director and acting teacher.

Early life and education 
Martina Laird was born in Port of Spain, Trinidad, in 1971. Her interest in Drama began early, when she was seven years old, and from the age of 13 she studied with such local luminaries as Beryl McBurnie, and regularly attended performances at the Little Carib Theatre. At the age of 17, Laird went to England, having won a national scholarship to study French at the University of Kent at Canterbury, and she did Drama as part of her degree course. Having told her parents of her acting ambitions at the age of 20, on the advice of Derek Walcott, who was a family friend, Laird went on to attend the Webber Douglas Academy of Dramatic Art.

Career 
After beginning her acting career on the stage, she landed a role in the BBC TV drama Casualty, most memorably playing the character Comfort for several years. She also featured in other popular television series, including Holby City and EastEnders.

Among her notable stage credits are as Sophia in Errol John's Moon on a Rainbow Shawl, directed by Michael Buffong, in a 2012 production at the Royal National Theatre, and Marcus Gardley's The House that Will Not Stand at the Tricycle Theatre (2014), as well as, since 2016, performances in several Shakespeare plays: The Taming of the Shrew, Romeo and Juliet, Julius Caesar, The Tempest and Henry IV, Coriolanus and All's Well That Ends Well. In 2019, Laird appeared in the August Wilson play King Hedley II, alongside Lenny Henry, at Stratford East.

Awards that Laird has won include a Screen Nation Award and Michael Elliot Trust Award.

Filmography

Theatre
 The White Devil, Royal Shakespeare Company, 1996
 Three Hours After Marriage, Royal Shakespeare Company, 1996–1997
 Troilus and Cressida, Royal Shakespeare Company, 1996–1997
 Breath Boom, Royal Court Theatre, 2000
 The Five Wives of Maurice Pinder, Royal National Theatre, 2007
 Bianca in Othello, Donmar Warehouse, London, 2007–2008
 Moon on a Rainbow Shawl, Royal National Theatre, 2012
 The House that Will Not Stand, Tricycle Theatre, 2014
 All's Well That Ends Well, Sam Wanamaker Playhouse, 2018
 Shebeen, Stratford East, 2018
 King Hedley II, Stratford East, 2019
 15 Heroines – Jermyn Street Theatre, 2020

References

External links 
 Martina Laird official website
 
 
  Ronald C. Emrit, "Martina Laird", Best of Trinidad.
 "Advice to my Younger Self: Martina Laird" (video). Bush Theatre, 8 April 2020.

1971 births
21st-century Trinidad and Tobago actresses
Alumni of the University of Kent
Alumni of the Webber Douglas Academy of Dramatic Art
Black British actresses
Living people
Shakespearean actresses
Trinidad and Tobago television actresses
Trinidad and Tobago emigrants to the United Kingdom
Trinidad and Tobago film actresses
Trinidad and Tobago stage actresses